Joshua Obiesie (born 23 May 2000) is a German professional basketball player for the Skyliners Frankfurt of the Basketball Bundesliga.

Early life and career 
Regionalliga, the fourth-tier German league. In February 2018, he was loaned to Brose Bamberg for the Munich qualifying tournament for the 2018 Adidas Next Generation Tournament, an international junior competition.

Professional career 
On 23 November 2018, Obiesie signed a contract with s.Oliver Würzburg of the Basketball Bundesliga until 2022. During the season, he continued to play for IBAM in the NBBL and with MTSV Schwabing in the 1. Regionalliga. Obiesie made his professional debut for Würzburg on 12 December, recording eight points and seven rebounds in a 95–77 win over Prishtina in the FIBA Europe Cup. On 26 December, in his Bundesliga debut versus Bayern Munich, he posted 12 points, four assists, and three steals. On 6 February 2019, Obiesie scored a career-high 21 points, with four three-pointers, in a 92–83 FIBA Europe Cup victory over Szolnoki Olaj. On 27 February, he was named to the 2019 NBBL All-Star Game. Obiesie, on 12 April, took part in the Nike Hoop Summit, where he faced top American high school players. On 21 April, he declared for the 2019 NBA draft. On 23 July 2021, Obiesie signed a three-year deal with Bayern Munich. He averaged 2.8 points per contest in 22 Bundesliga contests for the Munich side.

On July 19, 2022, he inked a two-year deal with fellow Bundesliga outfit Skyliners Frankfurt.

National team career 
In 2018, Obiesie played for the German national under-18 team at the Albert Schweitzer Tournament. In seven games, he averaged 11.1 points, 3.4 rebounds, and 2.0 assists per game, leading Germany to a gold medal. In February 2019, Obiesie was called up by the senior German national team for 2019 FIBA World Cup qualification but never suited up. He made his national team debut in late February 2020 against Great Britain.

References

External links 
Basketball Bundesliga profile
s.Oliver Würzburg profile

2000 births
Living people
FC Bayern Munich basketball players
German men's basketball players
S.Oliver Würzburg players
Skyliners Frankfurt players
Small forwards